This list of tallest buildings in Albuquerque ranks high-rises in the U.S. city of Albuquerque, New Mexico by height. The tallest building in Albuquerque is the 22-story Albuquerque Plaza Office Tower, which rises 351 feet (107 m) and was completed in 1990. It also stands as the tallest building in the state of New Mexico. The third-tallest building in Albuquerque is the Compass Bank Building which stood as the tallest building in the city and the state from 1966 until 1990. No Albuquerque buildings are among the tallest in the United States at over 700 feet (213 m) tall.

History 
Skyscrapers in Albuquerque began with the construction of the First National Bank Building in 1922, which is often regarded as the first skyscraper in New Mexico. The building, listed on the National Register of Historic Places, is now a residential tower known officially as "The Bank Lofts". 

Albuquerque went through a large building boom that lasted from the early 1960s to the early 1990s, during which time 20 of the city's 26 tallest buildings were constructed, including the Albuquerque Plaza complex. Most of Albuquerque's tall buildings are located in either Downtown or Uptown Albuquerque; however, there are some high-rises scattered throughout other areas of the city, including the Bank of the West Tower, which stands as the tallest building outside Downtown. Albuquerque has 36 completed high-rise buildings, more than any other city in New Mexico.

Tallest buildings
This lists ranks Albuquerque high-rises that stand at least 135 feet (41 m) tall, based on standard height measurement. An equal sign (=) following a rank indicates the same height between two or more buildings. The "Year" column indicates the year in which a building was completed.

Timeline of tallest buildings
 
This lists buildings that once held the title of tallest building in Albuquerque. Since 1990, this title has been held by the Albuquerque Plaza Office Tower.

Notes
A. This building was constructed as the First National Bank Building, and is still commonly referred to as such, but is now officially known as "The Bank Lofts".

References
General
Emporis.com - Albuquerque
Specific

External links
Diagram of Albuquerque high-rises on SkyscraperPage

Albuquerque
 
Tallest in Alberq